This is the results breakdown of the local elections held in Castilla–La Mancha on 26 May 1991. The following tables show detailed results in the autonomous community's most populous municipalities, sorted alphabetically.

Overall

City control
The following table lists party control in the most populous municipalities, including provincial capitals (shown in bold). Gains for a party are displayed with the cell's background shaded in that party's colour.

Municipalities

Albacete
Population: 129,002

Ciudad Real
Population: 58,175

Cuenca
Population: 43,209

Guadalajara
Population: 63,581

Talavera de la Reina
Population: 69,215

Toledo
Population: 60,671

See also
1991 Castilian-Manchegan regional election

References

Castilla-La Mancha
1991